This is a list of massacres that have taken place in Uganda, Africa.

List of massacres

References

Massacres in Uganda
Murder in Uganda
Human rights in Uganda
Coup
1970s coups d'état and coup attempts
Conflicts in 1971
1971